Vulturu may refer to several places in Romania:

 Vulturu, Constanța, a commune in Constanța County
 Vulturu, Vrancea, a commune in Vrancea County
 Vulturu, a village in Maliuc commune, Tulcea County
 Vulturu, a tributary of the river Motnău in Vrancea County

See also 
 Vultureni (disambiguation)
 Vulturești (disambiguation)